Helix (stylized in all caps) is the fifth studio album by the Swedish-Danish heavy metal band Amaranthe. It is also the first album featuring the band's new clean male vocalist Nils Molin (Dynazty), since the departure of the band's former clean male vocalist Jake E.

Track listing

Personnel
Olof Mörck – guitars, keyboards, synthesizers
Elize Ryd – female clean vocals
Morten Løwe Sørensen – drums
Johan Andreassen – bass
Henrik "GG6" Englund – harsh vocals
Nils Molin – male clean vocals

Charts

References

2018 albums
Amaranthe albums
Spinefarm Records albums
Albums produced by Jacob Hansen